Oundle railway station is a Grade II listed former railway station in Oundle, Northamptonshire on the former  Northampton and Peterborough Railway line which connected Peterborough and Northampton. In 1846 the line, along with the London and Birmingham, became part of the London and North Western Railway. At grouping in 1923 it became part of the London Midland and Scottish Railway.

History 
The stations on this line were probably the most extravagant of any.  They were designed by John William Livock and constructed in the Jacobean style from local stone. Originally the line was single and the Station house was of two stories with three gable ends facing on to the platform.  The line was doubled in 1846 and a second platform contained simply a waiting room.

In common with stations built on this line at this time the sidings on either side were accessed by wagon turntables connected by a line across the running lines at right angles to them.  The platforms were offset and this line ran between them, with a large goods shed adjacent to the main building.  Later a further running line was added in the Peterborough direction and more sidings were added curving away into a new goods yard, using double slips off the running lines.

Initially there were three trains a day, rising to six by 1883. Since the station lay outside the town an omnibus or post horse could be hired from the Talbot Hotel. At grouping in 1923 it became part of the London Midland and Scottish Railway.

Oundle was also the location of a substantial boarding school and special trains ran even after regular timetabled services finished in 1964.  British Railways finally closed the line in November 1972.

The section from Yarwell Junction to Wansford was taken over by the Nene Valley Railway, but not as far as Oundle. So the rails were lifted in the 1970s. The NVR nonetheless has aspirations to extend the Heritage line by six miles to a new Oundle terminus station.

References

External links
 Subterranea Britannica

Railway stations in Great Britain opened in 1845
Railway stations in Great Britain closed in 1972
Disused railway stations in Northamptonshire
Former London and Birmingham Railway stations
Beeching closures in England
John William Livock buildings
Oundle
Grade II listed railway stations
Grade II listed buildings in Northamptonshire